Maria Gustafsson (born 16 March 1967) is a Swedish orienteering competitor. She received a silver medal in the relay event at the 1995 World Orienteering Championships in Detmold, together with Anette Granstedt, Anna Bogren and Marlena Jansson.

References

1967 births
Living people
Swedish orienteers
Female orienteers
Foot orienteers
World Orienteering Championships medalists
20th-century Swedish women